Jocara extensa is a species of snout moth in the genus Jocara. It was described by Francis Walker in 1863. It is found in the Guyanas and Brazil.

References

Moths described in 1863
Jocara